Yuzana Plaza is a five-storey building located in Banyardala Road, Mingala Taungnyunt Township, Yangon, Myanmar (Burma).

Location 
Yuzana Plaza is located on Banyardala Road which is start from Theinbyu Tennis Court to Tamwe Circle. Yuzana Plaza is also near with Mingalar Shopping Mall (only 200 meters) and Kandawgyi Lake. It is located on the border of Mingala Taungnyunt Township and Tamwe Township. There is a bus stop called Yuzana Plaza Bus Stop opposite to it.

History 
Yuzana Plaza was completed in 1994 and shops in the plaza opened at the beginning of 1995. The owner of the plaza is Htay Myint, one of the richest people in Burma.

See also 
Myanmar Plaza

References

External links 
 Yuzana Plaza shops going out of business
 Business hours: Yuzana Plaza dispute resolved
 Map to Yuzana Plaza
 Airport Distance
 Repair Advise Guide

Buildings and structures in Yangon